The 1981 Golbaf earthquake occurred on June 11 at  with a moment magnitude of 6.6 and a maximum Mercalli intensity of VIII+ (Severe). Total damage was considered moderate and amounted to $5 million in financial losses, with many injured, and 1,400–3,000 killed.

See also
List of earthquakes in 1981
List of earthquakes in Iran
1981 Sirch earthquake

References

External links

1981 earthquakes
Earthquakes in Iran
1981 in Iran
History of Kerman Province